The Serpentine Pipehead Dam was constructed to use the Serpentine River, in Western Australia, to convey water from Serpentine Dam to the interconnection with the Metropolitan trunk main network. The dam is also used to store water from the Dandalup scheme whereby water can be pumped or gravity transferred back into the Serpentine Pipehead Dam. The dam site also contains a water treatment plant and picnic area.

External links 
 Dam storage level website
 Serpentine Dam facilities brochure

Dams completed in 1957
Dams in Western Australia
Shire of Serpentine-Jarrahdale